The Thankful Arnold House Museum is an American historic house museum in Haddam, Connecticut. It consists of a gambrel-roofed house built circa 1800, along with a garden and grounds. The museum is open year-round.

Description and history 
Built between 1794 and 1810, the house's namesake was Thankful Arnold (d. 1849). The couple had 11 children in 15 years of marriage, and Thankful Arnold continued to live in the house after her husband Joseph's death in 1823. The museum's director described the widow a "typical river valley housewife" of the post-American Revolution generation.

The house remained in the family until her great-great-grandson, Isaac Arnold, purchased it in 1963, paid for it to be restored, and donated it to the Haddam Historical Society. The house opened to the public that same year.

Named in honor of Isaac's daughter, the Wilhelmina Ann Arnold Barnhart Memorial Garden was dedicated in 1973. Plantings include herbs and vegetables commonly grown in the region's household gardens circa 1830.

The museum is a stop on the Connecticut Women's Heritage Trail.

References

External links 

 Official website

Haddam, Connecticut
Buildings and structures in Middlesex County, Connecticut
Museums in Middlesex County, Connecticut
History museums in Connecticut
Historic house museums in Connecticut
Houses in Middlesex County, Connecticut